GRAM domain containing 4 (GRAMD4) also known as Death-Inducing Protein (DIP) is a protein that is encoded by the GRAMD4 gene.

Function
GRAMD4 is a mitochondrial effector of E2F1 (MIM 189971)-induced apoptosis.

References

Further reading